Savinas (also Romanized as Savīnās, Sūnīās, and Sūynās; also known as Sūnīyās) is a village in Kani Bazar Rural District, Khalifan District, Mahabad County, West Azerbaijan Province, Iran. At the 2006 census, its population was 394, in 62 families.

References 

Populated places in Mahabad County